A Swedish Tiger (Swedish: En svensk tiger) is a 1948 Swedish war drama film directed by Gustaf Edgren and starring Edvin Adolphson, Erik Berglund and Margareta Fahlén. The film's sets were designed by the art director Nils Svenwall. Its title refers to the wartime propaganda campaign A Swedish Tiger encouraging inhabitants to avoid careless talk.

Synopsis
British intelligence discover that a Swedish actor in Stockholm is a doppelganger of a British general and decide to recruit him as a decoy. They lure him to London by offering him a part in Othello.

Cast
 Edvin Adolphson as 	John Tiger
 Erik Berglund as Fredrik Andersson
 Margareta Fahlén as 	Lena
 Sven Lindberg as 	Kurt Mueller aka Poniatovski
 Marianne Löfgren as 	Hanna Andersson-Tiger
 Gunnar Björnstrand as Hans Wolff
 Arnold Sjöstrand as 	Dickman
 Fritiof Billquist as 	Leonard Strömlund
 Olof Winnerstrand as 	Swedish Minister
 Gösta Cederlund as 	General
 Sture Djerf as 	Aide
 Carl Hagman as 	Photographer
 Ivar Hallbäck as Translator
 Douglas Håge as 	Frasse Fredriksson
 Gull Natorp as 	Klara
 Barbro Nordin as 	Mitzi
 Artur Rolén as 	Manuscript Writer
 Henrik Schildt as 	Chief Investigator
 Tord Stål as 	Engdahl
 Wiktor Andersson as 	A man

References

Bibliography 
 Fawkes, Richard. Opera on Film. Duckworth, 2000.

External links 
 

1948 films
Swedish drama films
1948 drama films
1940s Swedish-language films
Films directed by Gustaf Edgren
Films set in Stockholm
Films set in London
Swedish World War II films
1940s Swedish films